Gabriella Giorgelli (born 29 July 1941) is an Italian film and television actress. She appeared in more than 70 films between 1960 and 1998.

Biography

Early life 
Born in Fossola, a frazione of Carrara, Giorgelli was the daughter of a businessman in the marble industry and a housewife. 

As a child her parents  separated and she moved to Castelpoggio, another of Carrara's frazione and her mother's birthplace. Due to her mother's economic difficulties, at ten years of age, young old Gabriella was entrusted to the college of the Sisters of Capulet, in Carrara. At fifteen years old she started to work, including as a pizza chef and a bartender.

Career 
Giorgelli made her film debut in 1960, in a very minor role in Luigi Comencini's Everybody Go Home.

After winning several local and regional beauty contests, in 1961 she was among the finalists of Miss Italia, and thanks to her participation to the popular beauty pageant she started to attract a significant media attention, that allowed her to get more weighty film roles.

After appearing in several art films, in the late 1960s Giorgelli landed some leading roles in B-movies, mainly consisting of Spaghetti Westerns and Commedia sexy all'italiana films spoofing Pier Paolo Pasolini's  The Decameron, that she alternated with supporting roles in more prestigious and high-profile productions. She was also active in a number of series and TV-movies.

Giorgelli also appeared in many photo comics including Sadistik and is interviewed in the documentary film The Diabolikal Super-Kriminal.

Selected filmography

 Arturo's Island (1962) - Teresa
 La commare secca (1962) - Esperia
 The Organizer (1963) - Adele
 Outlaws of Love (1963) - Livia
 Shivers in Summer (1964) - Foschina
 Bebo's Girl (1964) - (segment "La Feuille de Route")
 Stranger in Sacramento (1965) - Liza Morgan
 The Dirty Game (1965)
 La ragazzola (1965) - Ines
 El Greco (1966) - Maria
 Maigret a Pigalle (1966) - Tatiana
 Una rete piena di sabbia (1966)
 Long Days of Vengeance (1967) - Dulcie
 Das Rasthaus der grausamen Puppen (1967) - Esther
 On My Way to the Crusades, I Met a Girl Who... (1967) - Dama di compagnia
 Two Faces of the Dollar (1967) - Janet
 Brutti di notte (1968) - Rosaspina Lacantara
 Emma Hamilton (1968) - Laurie Strong
 Operazione ricchezza (1968)
 I 2 deputati (1968) - Rosa
 In Search of Gregory (1969) - Encarna
 Il trapianto (1970) - Carmela
 Shango (1970) - Pamela
 Rough Justice (1970) - Juanita
 When Women Had Tails (1970) - L'esca (uncredited)
 Le Voyou (1970) - L'italienne
 Terzo canale - Avventura a Montecarlo (1970) - The Country Girl
 Tre nel mille (1971)
 Il mio nome è Mallory... M come morte (1971) - Cora Ambler
 Il clan dei due Borsalini (1971) - Bruna la Svelta
 Seven Blood-Stained Orchids (1972) - Ines Tamburini aka Toscana
 Cause of Divorce (1972) - Gasoline pump attendant
 Il Decamerone proibito (1972) - Monna Fiorenza
 Ubalda, All Naked and Warm (1972) - La Ragazza Nel Fienile
 Life Is Tough, Eh Providence? (1972) - Sister
 Fratello homo sorella bona (1972) - Mariangela
 Decameroticus (1972) - Elisa
 Those Dirty Dogs (1973) - Mexican Peasant
 Novelle licenziose di vergini vogliose (1973) - Zia / Aunt Alessandra
 The Police Serve the Citizens? (1973)
 Io e lui (1973) - Fausta - wife of Rico
 Pourvu qu'on ait l'ivresse (1974) - La tante
 Amore mio non farmi male (1974) - 'Cicci' - prostitute
 The Beast (1974) - Zoe
 Il lumacone (1974) - Paola
 Scusi eminenza... posso sposarmi? (1975)
 L'educanda (1975) - Marilena Bolognese
 La moglie vergine (1975) - Matilde
 La polizia brancola nel buio (1975) - Lucia
 Confessions of a Frustrated Housewife (1976) - Menica
 La moglie di mio padre (1976) - Prostitute
 And Agnes Chose to Die (1976) - Lorenza
 The Cynic, the Rat and the Fist (1977) - Maria Balzano
 Three Tigers Against Three Tigers (1977) - Cameriera Arrapata
 Target (1978) - Jasmine
 City of Women (1980) - Fishwoman of San Leo
 Il terno a letto (1980) - Filomena
 Roma dalla finestra (1982)
 Delitto sull'autostrada (1982) - Bocconotti Cinzia
 Hercules (1983) - Mother
 Wild Team (1985) - Psychic Medium
 A Tale of Love (1986) - Sergio's mother
 Moving Target (1988) - Billie Cody
 Wax Mask (1997) - Aunt Francesca
 La rumbera (1998) - Teresa

References

External links

1941 births
Living people
Italian film actresses
20th-century Italian actresses
People from Carrara